Nightmare Creatures II is a survival horror video game developed by Kalisto Entertainment and published by Konami for the PlayStation and Dreamcast. It is the sequel to Nightmare Creatures.

Plot
In 1934, Adam Crowley, an occultist, and antagonist from the previous game has created a vast race of mutant creatures, which he is using to wipe out a group of monster hunters called the Circle. Meanwhile, Herbert Wallace, a patient at Crowley's genetics hospital, escapes from captivity, armed with an axe. He arrives in London, where he discovers evidence of a picture of Ignatius Blackward, who in the previous game with Nadia Franciscus, had defeated Crowley. In a fire, Wallace is rescued from it by Rachel, the only surviving member of the Circle. They head their separate ways, with Wallace venturing to Crowley's castle, only to discover that Crowley himself is not there, but he is in Paris.

He then falls down a chute, which leads to a biplane that he flies to France. Wallace enters a cinema, where he finds a note from Rachel informing him that she knows of Crowley's plans. He then proceeds onwards to a museum to meet up with Rachel, but unknown to Wallace, Rachel is captured by zombies. Wallace then enters the museum, where he finds a detailed blueprint of the Eiffel Tower, along with some of Crowley's plans. In a crypt that Wallace enters, he is attacked by zombies, escapes in a car, and crashes in an elaborate graveyard after getting assaulted by a zombie that hid in the back, where he finds a part of Rachel's shirt snagged on a tree.

Wallace departs from the graveyard and falls into a sewer, which in turn takes him to the Paris underground, where he finds evidence of documents of ancient cults and a passage that leads to the Eiffel Tower. He then climbs to the top of the structure, where he finds a grotesque monstrosity. Using dynamite, he explodes the creature, only for the explosion to throw him off the top of the spire. However, his fall is cushioned, and he is reunited with Rachel, whereupon they walk away together. Whether Crowley is plotting his next scheme or gone forever is completely unknown.

Gameplay
The gameplay is similar to the previous installment, seeing the adrenaline bar abandoned and the addition of fatality moves to execute weakened enemies. Unlike the previous game though, Herbert is the only playable character and the unlockable ability to play as a monster is absent.

Music
The game features licensed music from Rob Zombie in the cutscenes while the in-game music was composed by the Nightmare Creatures composer, Frédéric Motte.

Reception

The PlayStation version of Nightmare Creatures II received "mixed" reviews, while the Dreamcast version received "unfavorable" reviews, according to the review aggregation website GameRankings. Greg Orlando of NextGen quoted a song by Carly Simon, "You're So Vain", in saying of the latter console version, "Konami's 'dream' turns out to be nothing but 'clouds in our coffee.'"

References

External links
 Official Website Archive
 

2000 video games
Dreamcast games
2000s horror video games
Konami games
PlayStation (console) games
Survival video games
Video game sequels
Video games developed in France
Video games scored by Frédéric Motte
Video games set in London
Video games set in Paris
Video games set in 1934
Single-player video games